Church of San Juan Bautista may refer to:

Church of San Juan Bautista (Alatoz)
Church of San Juan Bautista (Arganda del Rey)
Church of San Juan Bautista (Jodra del Pinar)
Church of San Juan Bautista (Talamanca de Jarama)
Church of San Juan Bautista, Dalcahue
Church of San Juan Bautista, Baños de Cerrato
Iglesia de San Juan Bautista (Maricao, Puerto Rico)
Iglesia San Juan Bautista y San Ramón Nonato, Juana Díaz, Puerto Rico